The 2018 Oracle Challenger Series – Chicago was a professional tennis tournament played on outdoor hard courts. This tournament was part of the 2018 ATP Challenger Tour and the 2018 WTA 125K series. The first edition took place from September 4 to 9, 2018 in Chicago, United States.

Men's singles main-draw entrants

Seeds

 1 Rankings are as of 27 August 2018.

Other entrants
The following players received wildcards into the singles main draw:
  JC Aragone
  Thai-Son Kwiatkowski
  Tommy Paul
  Andreas Seppi

The following players received entry into the singles main draw as alternates:
  Roberto Cid Subervi
  Ernesto Escobedo
  Dominik Köpfer
  Donald Young

The following players received entry from the qualifying draw:
  Sekou Bangoura
  Vincent Millot
  Hugo Nys
  Alexander Sarkissian

The following players received entry as lucky losers:
  Ruan Roelofse
  Kaichi Uchida

Women's singles main-draw entrants

Seeds

 1 Rankings are as of 27 August 2018.

Other entrants
The following players received wildcards into the singles main draw:
  Danielle Collins
  Lauren Davis
  Francesca Di Lorenzo
  Allie Kiick
  Varvara Lepchenko

The following players received entry from the qualifying draw:
  Françoise Abanda
  Kristie Ahn
  Robin Anderson
  Irina Falconi
  Sesil Karatantcheva
  Jamie Loeb

Withdrawals
  Jennifer Brady → replaced by  Duan Yingying 
  Dalila Jakupović → replaced by  Beatriz Haddad Maia 
  Vania King → replaced by  Zhu Lin 
  Magda Linette → replaced by  Madison Brengle 
  Christina McHale → replaced by  Jana Fett 
  Monica Niculescu → replaced by  Katie Boulter 
  Rebecca Peterson → replaced by  Mona Barthel 
  Monica Puig → replaced by  Ons Jabeur

Women's doubles main-draw entrants

Seeds 

 Rankings are as of 27 August 2018

Champions

Men's singles

  Denis Istomin def.  Reilly Opelka 6–4, 6–2.

Women's singles

  Petra Martić def.  Mona Barthel, 6–4, 6–1

Men's doubles

  Luke Bambridge /  Neal Skupski def.  Leander Paes /  Miguel Ángel Reyes-Varela, 6–3, 6–4

Women's doubles

  Mona Barthel /  Kristýna Plíšková def.  Asia Muhammad /  Maria Sanchez, 6–3, 6–2

References

External links 
 Official website

2018
2018 ATP Challenger Tour
2018 WTA 125K series
2018 in American sports